Alice Matilda "Olive" White Smith (December 25, 1846 - August 26, 1918) was an American writer and poet.

Early life
Alice Matilda "Olive" White was born in Clarendon, Vermont, on December 25, 1846. Her ancestors were among the early settlers of Vermont. Her father, Charles White, was a pioneer geologist and the discoverer of several of the Vermont marble quarries. Her childhood was passed among the Green Mountains. She grew up with a mind imbued with a stern morality, tempered by a love of humanity, which led her in girlhood to be intelligently interested in the abolition of slavery. 

She was educated under Mrs. H. F. Leavitt. in the female seminary established by Emma Willard, in Middlebury, Vermont.

Career
Olive White Smith was generally known in literature as Mrs. Clinton Smith. 

Home and foreign missions claimed her attention, and the Woman's Christian Temperance Union found in her an enthusiastic friend. Although her home was in a retired corner of the great world, so deep was her interest in public affairs that she lived in the current of passing events. 

Possessing a reverence for law she marveled at the ease with which the prohibitory liquor law of her State was evaded. After spending much time and energy in interviewing judges, justices, sheriffs and States' attorneys, she came to the conclusion that those officers, holding their positions through the votes of a political party, would go no further in good works than that party demands. Her parlors was a gathering place for temperance people and prohibitionists. She wrote some temperance articles and addresses, as well as short poems and stories, for New York papers and magazines. 

All of her life she was connected with Sunday-school work in the Methodist Episcopal Church. She was a contributor to the Rural New Yorker, the New York Weekly Witness, the Demorest's Magazine and other periodicals. 

She used the pen-names "Alicia" and "August Noon."

Personal life

Olive White married architect Clinton Smith (1846-1905) and their home was in Middlebury, Vermont, until 1891, when her husband accepted a position in the War Department at Washington, D.C., as Chief of Construction and Repair under Hon. Redfield Proctor, then secretary of War in Harrison's administration, and moved his family to that city, where Smith was actively engaged in literary pursuits.

They had 6 children: Charles Lynn Smith (1869-1875), Clifton Roberts Smith (1878-1923), Delmar White Smith (1874-1949, contracting builder in Manila), Harold Smith (1882-1967), Leon Neil Smith (1889-1936), Helena Mercy Smith (b. 1872) (wife of Prof. Charles J. Bullock of Harvard).

Clinton Smith designed many buildings in Middlebury and around Vermont, such as the court house, town hall, Methodist church, Baptist church, Beckwith block, Dyer block and many residences, including the South Pleasant Street, Middlebury, residence where they lived. He designed the Shard Villa, the stone residence in Salisbury, Vermont, of Columbus Smith. He designed also the library annex to the Capitol building in Montpelier, Vermont, and the Vermont State Hospital at Waterbury.

She died on August 26, 1918, and is buried with her husband at Foote Street Cemetery, Middlebury, under a beautiful monument.

References

1846 births
1918 deaths
19th-century American women writers
Woman's Christian Temperance Union people
People from Clarendon, Vermont
19th-century American non-fiction writers
American women non-fiction writers
Wikipedia articles incorporating text from A Woman of the Century